The Imperial Japanese Army's  was formed in 1944 from the 8th, 9th and 10th Guards Regiments and stayed in Japan to defend the homeland during the Second World War.

3rd Guards Division
 8th Guards Regiment
 9th Guards Regiment
 10th Guards Regiment

See also
Imperial Guard (Japan)

References 
 Madej, W. Victor, Japanese Armed Forces Order of Battle, 1937-1945 [2 vols] Allentown, PA: 1981.

Guards Divisions of Japan
Military units and formations established in 1944
Military units and formations disestablished in 1945
1944 establishments in Japan
1945 disestablishments in Japan